Owen Buckingham may refer to:

 Owen Buckingham (died 1713), MP for Reading 1698–1708, Lord May or London 1704–05
 Owen Buckingham (1674–1720), MP for Reading 1708–13, 1716–20

See also 
 Buckingham (surname)